Boons Path is an unincorporated community in Lee County, Virginia, United States.

Boons Path contained a post office from 1873 until 1919.

References

Unincorporated communities in Lee County, Virginia
Unincorporated communities in Virginia